Maple Leaf is a United States National Historic Landmark  in Jacksonville,  Florida, United States. Maple Leaf, a side paddlewheel steamship, was first launched as a freight and passenger vessel from the Marine Railway Yard in Kingston, Upper Canada in 1851. The  sidewheel paddle steamer measured  at the beam.

Sinking

Maple Leaf was a civilian merchant steamship, chartered as a transport by the Union Army during American Civil War, that struck a Confederate torpedo - what we would now call a mine - as she was crossing the St. Johns River near Jacksonville on April 1, 1864. Four crew members lost their lives in the sinking. This was the first mine casualty of the war. The screw steamer  was dispatched to assess the condition of the wreck on April 2, and Captain Henry W. Dale concluded his ship and cargo as a total loss.

Wreck

Maple Leaf′s wreck site is located in the St. Johns River, to the west of the adjacent Mandarin neighborhood, in southeastern Duval County. The wreck was deemed a threat to river navigation so the U.S. Army Corps of Engineers had all structural components above the ship's main deck removed to clear the channel in the 1880s.  The shipwreck was rediscovered by the St. Johns Archaeological Expeditions, Inc. in 1984. Volunteers identified the wreck in 1984.  The shipwreck site has been given the Smithsonial trinomial 8DU8032.

Because of the wreck's remarkable state of preservation (down to the line cleared in the 1880s), it is the most significant Civil War-era shipwrecks yet discovered, and a good example of a mid-19th century Great Lakes steamer.  On October 12, 1994, it was designated a National Historic Landmark.

See also
 List of National Historic Landmarks in Florida
 National Register of Historic Places listings in Duval County, Florida

References

External links

 Maple Leaf (Shipwreck Site) at Florida's Shipwrecks: 300 Years of Maritime History - A National Register of Historic Places Travel Itinerary
 Florida's Office of Cultural and Historical Programs
 Duval County markers
 Maple Leaf
 Maple Leaf Shipwreck

1851 ships
Ships built in Ontario
National Register of Historic Places in Duval County, Florida
Shipwrecks in rivers
Shipwrecks on the National Register of Historic Places in Florida
Shipwrecks of the American Civil War
Ships sunk by mines
Maritime incidents in April 1864
National Historic Landmarks in Florida